Lower Deer Lake is an alpine lake in Custer County, Idaho, United States, located in the Boulder Mountains in Sawtooth National Recreation Area. While no trails lead to the lake, it is most easily accessed from trails 111 or 215. It is located just north and downstream of Upper Deer Lake.

References

Lakes of Idaho
Lakes of Custer County, Idaho
Glacial lakes of the Sawtooth National Forest